Hatcherichnus is a trace fossil ichnogenus from the Late Jurassic Morrison Formation.

References

Morrison fauna